The Paulista Revolt of 1924, also known as the Forgotten Revolution, Isidoro Revolution, Revolution of 1924  and the Second 5 July, was the second tenentist revolt in Brazil. The armed conflict took place mainly in and around  the city of São Paulo between 5 and 28 July 1924. It was based in the dissatisfaction of junior officers with the country's economic crisis and the concentration of power in the hands of politicians from São Paulo and Minas Gerais states.

Outbreak of the revolt

Commanded by general Isidoro Dias Lopes, the revolt involved a number of junior officers, including Joaquim do Nascimento Fernandes Távora (who died in the revolt), Juarez Távora, Miguel Costa, Eduardo Gomes, Artur Índio do Brasil e Silva and João Cabanas. The main aim was to depose President Artur Bernardes, who was considered an enemy of the army since the publication of the forged “cartas falsas” correspondence with Raul Soares de Moura in which the President appeared to have made anti-army insults. Among the demands of the revolt were the introduction of the secret ballot, free access to justice and compulsory public education.

The revolt broke out in São Paulo on 5 July 1924. The governor, Carlos de Campos, was forced to flee to the suburb of Penha on 9 July, after the bombardment of the Palácio dos Campos Elísios, seat of the state government. De Campos set up a temporary headquarters in a railway carriage at Guaiaúna station, where troops of the Federal government had arrived from Mogi das Cruzes.

Fighting in São Paulo
Outside the city, in the interior of São Paulo state, a number of cities and prefectures were taken over by the rebels.  They contacted the Vice-President of the Republic, Colonel :pt:Fernando Prestes de Albuquerque in Itapetininga and invited him to assume the head of the revolutionary government. However he had already formed a battalion to defend the constitutional government, and absolutely refused to associate with the rebels.

The city of São Paulo was subjected to bombing by aircraft of the Federal government. The armed forces spoke of imposing a "terrifying bombardment" of various parts of the city, particularly working-class bairros like Mooca and Brás, as well as middle class areas such as Perdizes. With neither aircraft nor artillery of their own, the rebels were eventually forced out of the city in the early morning of 28 July, and at ten that morning Carlos de Campos returned to his office in the government buildings.

The revolt left 503 dead, 4,864 wounded, and caused around 250,000 of the city's inhabitants to flee to other towns for safety.

Defeat and retreat
The rebels fell back on Bauru, from where Isidoro Dias Lopes launched a disastrous attack on the Federal army in the city of Três Lagoas. Fully one third of the rebel troops were killed, severely wounded, or captured.  The remainder fled south to Foz do Iguaçu, where they joined up with forces commanded by Luís Carlos Prestes, establishing the largest guerilla force in Brazil to date, the Coluna Prestes.

Aftermath

An enquiry conducted by the State of São Paulo soon after the defeat of the rebels found that there had been innumerable cases of destruction and rape in the interior, particularly under the rebel lieutenant João Cabanas, who commanded a group known as the “Death Column.” It also found that a number of colonels in the interior, opposed to Carlos de Campos, had supported the rebellion.

Divisional general Abílio Noronha, commander of the 2nd Military Region, that included São Paulo, Mato Grosso and Mato Grosso do Sul, accused certain politicians of being behind the revolt, inciting the soldiers to join it.  Another general criticised de Campos’ hasty withdrawal from São Paulo, claiming that with the loyal troops at his disposal he could have defeated the rebels within the city at the start of the revolt.

The junior officers and other soldiers who took part in the revolt were amnestied by President Getúlio Vargas shortly after the  Revolution of 1930, along with everyone else who had taken part in rebellions in the 1920s.

In Perdizes, the revolution of 1924 is still commemorated each year.

See also

Revolutions of Brazil
Constitutionalist Revolution

References

External links
 Virtual exhibition about the Revolution if 1924 (in Portuguese)
 Letters from the Revolution of 1924 (in Portuguese)
 São Paulo Won't Forget (in Portuguese)

First Brazilian Republic
20th-century revolutions
Revolutions in Brazil
Conflicts in 1924
1924 in Brazil
History of São Paulo (state)
20th century in São Paulo
Modern history of Brazil